McDonough Bolyard Peck, Inc. (MBP) is a construction management company in the United States with headquarters in Fairfax, Virginia.  It provides a variety of construction management services such as cost estimating, value engineering, constructability review, CPM scheduling, inspection, building information modeling, and facilities management. The firm is also active in many forms of Alternative Disputes Resolution (ADR).  The firm serves private and governmental owners, designers, contractors, developers and attorneys on a wide range of transportation, building, plant, environmental and utilities projects.

Operations 
McDonough Bolyard Peck was founded in 1989 by Frank McDonough, Charlie Bolyard, and Blake Peck.  The corporate headquarters are located in Fairfax, Virginia, while branch offices are maintained in Maryland, Georgia, Virginia, New York, Pennsylvania, Florida and North Carolina.

Major Projects 

Airport
 USCG Elizabeth City Airport : North Carolina
 Raleigh-Durham International Airport : North Carolina
 Roanoke Regional Airport : Roanoke, Virginia
 Dulles International Airport : Dulles, Virginia

Federal
 United States Capitol Visitor Center: Washington, DC
 National Geospatial Intelligence Agency Headquarters, New Campus East: Springfield, VA
 National Gallery of Art: Washington, DC
 Naval Facilities (NAVFAC) Washington Base Relocation and Closing (BRAC): Washington, DC

Healthcare
 Durham Regional Hospital: Durham, NC
 Walter Reed National Military Medical Center: Washington, DC
 Burell Center Renovation Project: Roanoke, VA
 Harbour Inn Convalescent Center: Baltimore, MD
 University of Virginia Hospital Renovation: Charlottesville, VA
 Ft. Belvoir Community Hospital: Ft. Belvoir, VA

Higher Education
 University of North Carolina Wilmington School of Education: Wilmington, North Carolina
 Duquesne University: Pittsburgh, PA
 University of Virginia: Charlottesville, VA
 George Mason University: Fairfax, VA
 Virginia Tech: Blacksburg, VA
 University of Maryland, College Park: College Park, MD
 Virginia State University Arena: Richmond, VA

Judicial
 Arlington County Courthouse and Police Facility: Arlington, VA
 Fairfax County Courthouse Expansion: Fairfax, VA
 Maricopa County Jail:  Phoenix, AZ
 Montgomery County Correctional Facility: Seneca, MD

K-12 Education
 Washington-Lee High School: Arlington, VA
 Kettle Run Elementary School: Warrenton, VA
 Patterson Elementary School: Washington, DC
 Port Towns Elementary School: Bladensburg, MD

Office and Mixed Use
 Liberty Place II: Philadelphia, PA
 Jefferson at Penn Quarter: Washington, DC
 Harbor Point West Condominiums: Woodbridge, VA

Heavy Industrial
 Johnstown Channel Rehabilitation: Johnstown, PA

Transportation
 Springfield Interchange: Springfield, VA
 I-64 Battlefield Boulevard Reconstruction: Hampton Roads, VA
 Dulles Corridor Metrorail Project, Silver Line (WMATA), Phase 2: VA
 I-264 Military Highway Interchange
 ITS "Smart Road": Blacksburg, VA
 US Route 11 Memorial Bridge: Radford, VA

International Projects

  US Embassy: Kampala, Uganda
  World Bank Country Office: Dhaka, Bangladesh
  Ertan Dam: Sichuan, China
  Sarlux IGCC Power Plant:  Sarroch, Italy
  Nathpa Jhakri Hydro-Electric Project Himachal Pradesh, India

References

External links 
 Official site

Construction and civil engineering companies of the United States
Companies established in 1989
Companies based in Virginia